Adis Lagumdzija (born 29 March 1999) is a Turkish professional volleyball player of Bosniak descent. He is a member of the Turkey national team. At the professional club level, he plays for Modena Volley.

Honours

Clubs
 National championships
 2017/2018  Turkish Championship, with Arkas İzmir
 2018/2019  Turkish Championship, with Arkas İzmir

Individual awards
 2017: CEV U19 European Championship – Most Valuable Player
 2021: European League – Most Valuable Player

References

External links
 
 Player profile at LegaVolley.it 
 Player profile at Volleybox.net

1999 births
Living people
Sportspeople from Sarajevo
Turkish people of Bosnia and Herzegovina descent
Turkish men's volleyball players
Turkish expatriate sportspeople in Italy
Expatriate volleyball players in Italy
Galatasaray S.K. (men's volleyball) players
Arkas Spor volleyball players
Opposite hitters